Archibald's Next Big Thing and Archibald's Next Big Thing Is Here! are American animated comedy television series created by Tony Hale for Netflix and Peacock. The plot revolves around Archibald Strutter, a positive chicken who often goes astray from home, but eventually always finds his way back home.

The series debuted on September 6, 2019	on Netflix. Its second season was released on March 20, 2020.

On January 26, 2021, the new series was announced, which saw the series move to Peacock and rebrand as Archibald's Next Big Thing Is Here!, which premiered on February 18, 2021. The second season premiered on April 22, 2021, the third on July 15, 2021, and the fourth on October 14, 2021.

Voice cast
Main Voice Cast

 Tony Hale as Archibald
 Adam Pally as Sage, Archibald's older brother who enjoys the outdoors
 Chelsea Kane as Loy, Archibald's sister who likes inventing things and doing science
 Jordan Fisher as Finly, Archibald's brother who likes singing, dancing and art
 Kari Wahlgren as Bea, Archibald's best friend and sidekick 
 Rosamund Pike as the Narrator
 
Recurring Voice Cast
 Kari Wahlgren as Murph, Cheryl, additional voices
 Roger Craig Smith as Cousin Ashley, Mayor Fowler, Brock, additional voices
 Kevin Michael Richardson as Ronald, Moe, Dave, additional voices
 Eric Bauza as Mikael, Nitro Ned, additional voices
 Casey Wilson as Wendi Powers, a reporter
 Matty Cardarople as Preston, a bird who works various jobs
 Chris Parnell as Dr. Fluffberg
 Gary Cole as Officer Jones
 Lauren Blumenfeld as Roxlyn, Archibald's unicorn pen pal
 Aaron LaPlante as Gorbit

Guest Voice Cast
 JP Karliak as Mr. Hackensack

Notable Guest Stars
 Christine Baranski as Madame Baroness, a glamorous singer
 "Weird Al" Yankovic as Jasper  
 RuPaul as Jonathan Jagger, a fashion designer llama
 Julia Louis-Dreyfus as Claire the Astronaut Monkey who actually has a fear of space
 Adam Ray as Johnny Hawkstorm, an action movie star
 Joel McHale as Jean Pierre 
 Taylor Trensch as Archibald's singing voice
 Jane Lynch as Dotty Culpepper
 Henry Winkler as Herman Sherman
 John O'Hurley as Dr. Eggleston
 Rachael Ray as the Krak-hen
 Justin Long as Mr. Skunkmeyer
 Ana Gasteyer as Mimsy
 Laraine Newman as Suzie

Episodes

Archibald's Next Big Thing

Series overview

Season 1 (2019)

Season 2 (2020)

Archibald's Next Big Thing Is Here!

Series overview

Season 1 (2021)

Season 2 (2021)

Season 3 (2021)

Season 4 (2021)

References

External links

2010s American animated television series
2020s American animated television series
2019 American television series debuts
2019 animated television series debuts
American children's animated adventure television series
American children's animated comedy television series
English-language Netflix original programming
Netflix children's programming
Peacock (streaming service) original programming
Peacock (streaming service) children's programming
Television series about chickens
Television series by DreamWorks Animation
Television series by Universal Television